Roy Warren Spencer (born December 20, 1955) is a meteorologist, a principal research scientist at the University of Alabama in Huntsville, and the U.S. Science Team leader for the Advanced Microwave Scanning Radiometer (AMSR-E) on NASA's Aqua satellite. He has served as senior scientist for climate studies at NASA's Marshall Space Flight Center. He is known for his satellite-based temperature monitoring work, for which he was awarded the American Meteorological Society's Special Award. Spencer disagrees with the scientific consensus that most global warming in the past 50 years is the result of human activity, instead believing that anthropogenic greenhouse gas emissions have caused some warming, but that influence is small compared to natural variations in global average cloud cover.

Education and career
Spencer received a BS in atmospheric sciences from the University of Michigan in 1978 and his MS and PhD in meteorology from the University of Wisconsin–Madison in 1980 and 1982. His doctoral thesis was titled, A case study of African wave structure and energetics during Atlantic transit.

After receiving his PhD in 1982, Spencer worked for two years as a research scientist in the Space Science and Engineering Center at the University of Wisconsin–Madison. He then joined NASA's Marshall Space Flight Center as a visiting scientist in 1984, where he later became senior scientist for climate studies. After leaving NASA in 2001, Spencer has been a principal research scientist at the University of Alabama in Huntsville (UAH). As well as his position at UAH, Spencer is currently the U.S. Science Team leader for the Advanced Microwave Scanning Radiometer (AMSR-E) on NASA's Aqua satellite, a position he has held since 1994.

In 2001, he designed an algorithm to detect tropical cyclones and estimate their maximum sustained wind speed using the Advanced Microwave Sounding Unit (AMSU).

Spencer has been a member of several science teams: the Tropical Rainfall Measuring Mission (TRMM) Space Station Accommodations Analysis Study Team, Science Steering Group for TRMM, TOVS Pathfinder Working Group, NASA Headquarters Earth Science and Applications Advisory Subcommittee, and two National Research Council (NRC) study panels.

He is on the board of directors of the George C. Marshall Institute, and on the board of advisors of the Cornwall Alliance for the Stewardship of Creation.

Spencer's research work is funded by NASA, NOAA, DOE, and the DOT

Peer-reviewed articles on climate change

Negative cloud feedback
In 2007, Spencer and others published a paper in Geophysical Research Letters regarding negative cloud feedback in the tropics that potentially supports Richard Lindzen's Iris hypothesis, which proposes that as the tropical atmosphere warms, cirrus clouds decrease, allowing infrared heat to escape from the atmosphere to outer space. Spencer stated, "To give an idea of how strong this enhanced cooling mechanism is, if it was operating on global warming, it would reduce estimates of future warming by over 75 percent. [...] Right now, all climate models predict that clouds will amplify warming. I'm betting that if the climate models' 'clouds' were made to behave the way we see these clouds behave in nature, it would substantially reduce the amount of climate change the models predict for the coming decades."

Cloud formation and temperature change
In 2008, Spencer and William Braswell published a paper in the Journal of Climate which suggests that natural variations in how clouds form could actually be causing temperature changes, rather than the other way around, and could also lead to overestimates of how sensitive the Earth's climate is to greenhouse gas emissions. Spencer stated, "Our paper is an important step toward validating a gut instinct that many meteorologists like myself have had over the years, [...] that the climate system is dominated by stabilizing processes, rather than destabilizing processes – that is, negative feedback rather than positive feedback."

Energy lost to space as compared to climate models
In 2011, Spencer and Braswell published a paper in Remote Sensing concluding that more energy is radiated back to space and released earlier than previously thought. Spencer stated, "The satellite observations suggest there is much more energy lost to space during and after warming than the climate models show. There is a huge discrepancy between the data and the forecasts that is especially big over the oceans."

The paper was criticized by climate scientists. Kerry Emanuel of MIT, said this work was cautious and limited mostly to pointing out problems with forecasting heat feedback.

The editor-in-chief of Remote Sensing, Wolfgang Wagner, later resigned over publication of Spencer and Braswell (2011), stating, "From a purely formal point of view, there were no errors with the review process. [...] the problem I see with the paper by Spencer and Braswell is not that it declared a minority view ...but that it essentially ignored the scientific arguments of its opponents. This latter point was missed in the review process, explaining why I perceive this paper to be fundamentally flawed and therefore wrongly accepted by the journal." Wagner added he, "would also like to personally protest against how the authors and like-minded climate skeptics have much exaggerated the paper's conclusions in public statements".

Andrew Dessler later published a paper opposing the claims of Spencer and Braswell (2011) in Geophysical Research Letters.
He stated, among other things:

Views

Climate change
Spencer has published two books on climate change: In 2008, Climate Confusion: How Global Warming Hysteria Leads to Bad Science, Pandering Politicians and Misguided Policies that Hurt the Poor, and in 2010, The Great Global Warming Blunder: How Mother Nature Fooled the World's Top Climate Scientists.

He believes that most climate change is natural in origin, the result of long-term changes in the Earth's albedo and that anthropogenic greenhouse gas emissions have caused some warming, but that its warming influence is small compared to natural, internal, chaotic fluctuations in global average cloud cover. This view contradicts the scientific consensus that "most of the warming observed over the last 50 years is attributable to human activities".

In February 2014 Spencer posted on his blog that he was going to start referring to those who referred to those questioning the mainstream view of global warming (such as Spencer himself) as "climate change deniers" as "global warming Nazis", contending that "...these people are supporting policies that will kill far more people than the Nazis ever did." The Anti-Defamation League responded with a statement condemning Spencer's comparison. Shelley Rose, the ADL's Southeast Interim Regional Director, argued that the comparison of global warming advocates to Nazis was "outrageous and deeply offensive," and "This analogy is just the latest example of a troubling epidemic of comparisons to Hitler and the Holocaust."

Intelligent design
Spencer believes in the pseudoscience of intelligent design which was criticized by Phil Plait, in Slate as advocating "warmed-over creationism." Spencer's views on the matter were used as an example in an exploration by the Christian Science Monitor as a possible connection between climate change denial and creationism.

Awards
 1989 – Marshall Space Flight Center Center Director's Commendation
 1990 – Alabama House of Representatives Resolution #624
 1991 – NASA Exceptional Scientific Achievement Medal (with John Christy)
 1996 – American Meteorological Society Special Award "for developing a global, precise record of earth's temperature from operational polar-orbiting satellites, fundamentally advancing our ability to monitor climate." (with John Christy)

See also
 John Christy (satellite temperature record)
 UAH satellite temperature dataset

Selected publications

Articles

Books

Peer-reviewed papers

References

External links

 
 Roy Spencer – NASA Profile US AMSR-E Science Team Leader
 Roy Spencer – Select Works, George C. Marshall Institute
 
 Roy Spencer – Satellite Evidence for Global Warming Being Driven by the Pacific Decadal Oscillation presentation at the 2009 International Conference on Climate Change
 Critique of Roy Spencer's book The Great Global Warming Blunder by Barry Bickmore, professor of geochemistry at Brigham Young University

1955 births
Living people
American meteorologists
People from Huntsville, Alabama
University of Alabama in Huntsville faculty
University of Michigan College of Engineering alumni
University of Wisconsin–Madison College of Letters and Science alumni
NASA people